Vanhornia is a genus of parasitic wasps. Of the four known species, V. eucnemidarum (type) is widespread across North America, V. leileri is widespread across the Palearctic, V. quizhouensis is found in South China and Thailand, and V. yurii is found in Northeast Asia. Members of Vanhornia are parasitoids on beetles belonging to the family Eucnemidae.

Species
 Vanhornia eucnemidarum Crawford, 1909
 Vanhornia leileri Hedqvist, 1976
 Vanhornia quizhouensis (He & Chu 1990)
 Vanhornia yurii Timokhov & Belokobylskij, 2020

References

Parasitic wasps
Articles created by Qbugbot
Proctotrupoidea